Mahamadou Baradji (born March 8, 1984 in Châtenay-Malabry, France) is a French basketball player who played for French Pro A club Bourg during the 2003-2005 seasons.

References

French men's basketball players
1984 births
Living people
People from Châtenay-Malabry
Sportspeople from Hauts-de-Seine
21st-century French people